Nothing Changes If Nothing Changes is the second studio album by American rapper Radamiz. It was released on October 4, 2019, by Payday Records. The album features guest appearances from Dot Demo, Tedy Andreas, Rothstein, Adrian Daniel, Rudy Catwell, Riz Allah, DJ Cutbird, Oxytocin, and Khalik Allah.

Release and promotion
In April 2018, Radamiz revealed his signing to the newly relaunched Payday Records as well as announcing a follow up to  Writeous, telling HipHopDX that "I didn't get signed off what I released, I got signed off what I'm working on." On May 18, 2018, Radamiz released his first single "V.I.M.", produced by New York producer, V'Don. "V.I.M." earned his first appearance on Ebro Darden's show on Beats 1 radio on May 21, 2018.

On September 21, 2018, Radamiz released his second single "NYNYNYNY", which he described to Passionweiss as "Just New York anxiety. Of course you're going to get the slow, mellow, smoking a blunt on a cold winter, rap. But you're going to get the introspective shit also." Five months later, Radamiz released his third single, "Save the Youth" featuring History and Tedy Andreas that was featured in Need for Speed Heat.

On September 12, 2019, the album's fourth and final single, "Fake Gucci", produced by Statik Selektah was premiered with Billboard. With the announcement, Radamiz also revealed the album's release date of October 4, 2019. Two weeks later, he released the music video to "Fake Gucci". From September 20 till the day of release, Radamiz unveiled daily the tracklist on social media for Nothing Changes If Nothing Changes. Starting with "Lotta Praise" and finishing with "Shadowboxing".

Track listing
Credits adapted from Tidal and iTunes' metadata.

Notes
 signifies an additional producer
 "Shadowboxing" features additional vocals by Dulce Peralta, History, King Critical, Dre Dollasz, Madwiz, and Riz Allah
 "Stage Fright" features arrangement by Radamiz
 "Knuckles" features additional vocals by Riggamortis, Sunflowah, and History
 "Save The Youth" features additional vocals by Dulce Peralta
 "V.I.M." features additional saxophone by Corey Staggz and additional vocals by Madwiz and Joffy
 "God Is Not Money" features additional vocals by Kota the Friend
 "Nuyorican Poets Cafe (Interlude)" features arrangement by Radamiz and History
 "NYNYNYNY" features additional vocals by History and Remarkable B
 "Seven Digits" features arrangement by Radamiz and additional vocals by Dulce Peralta, Sakinah Bashir, and Oxytocin
 "Lotta Praise" features additional vocals by Dulce Peralta and Radhames Rodriguez Sr.

Sample credits
 "V.I.M." contains a sample from "The E. Song", written by Oliver Doerell and Roger Dorell, and performed by Dictaphone
 "Benzo" contains a sample from "Fashion International (a)", written and performed by Graham De Wilde

Personnel

 Adam Freeman – legal
 Adrian Daniel – featured artist
 Adrian Nunez – A&R for Payday Records
 Blair Norf – producer 
 Blank Noriega – producer 
 Brandon "Brigante" Marquez – A&R
 Budgie – producer 
 Bvtman – producer 
 Chris Conway – co-executive producer; recording and mixing at No Mystery Studios in New York, New York
 Corey Staggz – saxophone 
 DJ Cutbird – featured artist; scratches 
 DJ Finyl – producer 
 Dot Demo – featured artist
 Dre Dollasz – producer 
 Dulce Peralta – additional vocals 
 Francisco Felix – A&R
 Gabe Monro – producer 
 The Goonie Tunes – producer 
 Howard "History/H. Illa" Kennedy – co-executive producer; additional vocals ; arrangement ; featured artist; producer 
 Ivan Jackson – producer 
 Joffy – additional vocals 
 Khalik Allah – featured artist
 King Critical – additional vocals 
 Kota the Friend – additional vocals 
 Leigha Healy – A&R for Payday Records
 Madwiz – additional vocals 
 Michael Fossenkemper – mastering at TurtleTone Studios in New York, New York
 MP Williams – producer 
 OnGaud – producer 
 Oxytocin – featured artist; additional vocals 
 Park Ave. – producer 
 Radamiz – vocals; arrangement; art direction; executive producer; producer 
 Radhames Rodriguez Sr. – additional vocals 
 Remarkable B – additional vocals 
 Riggamortis – additional vocals 
 Riz Allah – featured artist; additional vocals 
 Rothstein – featured artist
 Rudy Catwell – featured artist; producer 
 Sakinah Bashir – additional vocals 
 Sam Lindenfeld – artwork, art direction
 Statik Selektah – producer 
 Sunflowah – additional vocals 
 Tedy Andreas – featured artist; recording 
 V'Don – producer 
 Vintage Vandals – producer 
 Will Scott – marketing; product management; sample clearance

Appearances
The song "Save The Youth" was featured in the video game Need for Speed Heat in 2019.

References

2019 albums
Albums produced by Statik Selektah